The Bangladesh Tarikat Federation (BTF) is a secular-Sufi political party in Bangladesh founded by Syed Najibul Bashar of the Maizbhandaria tariqah and some Pir-Mashaikh of Bangladesh. Bashar is currently the only MP representing the party in the Jatiya Sangsad.

Formation

The Bangladesh Tarikat Federation was founded in 2005 following Syed Najibul Bashar's resignation from the Bangladesh Nationalist Party, as the party had formed an alliance with the Jamaat-e-Islami which Bashar accuses of supporting terrorists.

Elections
During the 2008 Bangladeshi general elections, the federation had 45 candidates across the country but were unable to gain any seats.

Following the 2014 Bangladeshi general elections however, the federation managed to gain two parliamentary seats; with Bashar in Chittagong-2 and the party's erstwhile secretary-general M. A. Awal in Lakshmipur-1. In 2017, Awal attempted to form a coalition of Islamic parties which would include the Islami Oikya Jote along with the Khilafat Andolan, Faraizi Andolan and the Imam-Ulama Parishad. However, this attempt was opposed by Bashar, the chairman of the federation. On 17 April 2018, Bashar replaced Awal with Syed Rezaul Haq Chandpuri as secretary-general.

The party sought 30 seats to contest the 2018 Bangladeshi general election under the Grand Alliance. The party managed to only keep the Chittagong-2 constituency, which is also the headquarters of the Maizbhandaria order.

Views
In reaction to the July 2016 Dhaka attack, Bashar claimed that the Qawmi Madrasah system was to blame for the emergence of Terrorism in Bangladesh.

References

 
2005 establishments in Bangladesh
Islamic political parties in Bangladesh
Islamist groups
Political parties in Bangladesh
Sufi organizations